Nuestra Señora de la Asunción (also known as Catedral de la Campina, Spanish for "Cathedral of the Countryside") is a Roman Catholic church in  Bujalance, Andalusia, southern Spain.

It originates from the church of Santa Maria, which was built above the medieval  mosque, near the town's Alcazaba, after the area had been conquered by Ferdinand III of Castile. The Gothic cross-vault ceiling is the oldest part of the church.

The Renaissance high altar (16th century)  is attributed to Guillermo de Orta  and Andrés de Castillejo, with paintings by Leonardo Enríquez de Navarra. Next to the altar is a small hexagonal chapel in Baroque style, from the early 18th century. Other artworks include the Roccoco case by the Cordoban goldsmith Damián de Castro, a large canvas of the Battle of Lepanto and a side Baroque portal in pink marble. 

The tilting tower, begun in 1611 and finished in 1788, has a height of 55 meters.

External links
Page at monumentalnet website 

Churches in Andalusia
Renaissance architecture in Andalusia
Bien de Interés Cultural landmarks in the Province of Córdoba (Spain)